Shiki District may refer to:
 Shiki District, Afghanistan, of Badakhshan Province in Afghanistan
 Shiki District, Nara, of Nara Prefecture in Japan